The Bismarck crow (Corvus insularis) is a species of crow found in the Bismarck Archipelago. It was considered by many authorities to be a subspecies of the Torresian crow (C. orru), but is now treated as a distinct species.

References

Bismarck crow
Birds of the Bismarck Archipelago
Bismarck crow